Rael may refer to:

People

Given name
 Raël (born 1946), French UFO-religion leader and racing driver
 Rael Artel (born 1980), Estonian art writer, curator and gallerist
 Rael Dornfest, American computer programmer and author
 Rael Levitt (born 1971), South African businessman
 Rael Toffolo (born 1976), Brazilian musician, composer and musicologist

Characters
 Rael, the protagonist of the 1974 concept album The Lamb Lies Down on Broadway by Genesis
 Rael, a character in the 1968 Star Trek episode "Wink of an Eye", played by actor Jason Evers

Surname
 Chris Rael, American musician and composer
 James Rael (born 1992), Irish rugby union player
 Joseph Rael (born 1935), Native American ceremonial dancer and shamanism writer
 Juan Bautista Rael (1900–1993), American linguist and folklorist
 Nguriatukei Rael Kiyara (born 1984), Kenyan long-distance runner

Places
 Rael, Syria
 Rael Kedam

Other uses
 "Rael", a song by The Who from the 1967 album The Who Sell Out
 Renewable and Appropriate Energy Laboratory (RAEL), at the University of California, Berkeley

See also
 Raëlism
 Real (disambiguation)